Ion Guţu (born 7 January 1943) is a Moldovan politician.

Biography 

He served as member of the Parliament of Moldova (1990–1994, 2005–2009).

External links 
 Parlamentul Republicii Moldova
  List of candidates to the position of deputy in the Parliament of the Republic of Moldova for parliamentary elections of 6 March, 2005 of the Electoral Bloc “Moldova Democrata”
 List of deputies elected in the March 6 parliamentary elections
 Lista deputaţilor aleşi la 6 martie 2005 în Parlamentul Republicii Moldova
 Cine au fost şi ce fac deputaţii primului Parlament din R. Moldova (1990-1994)?
 Declaraţia deputaţilor din primul Parlament

References

1943 births
Living people
Moldovan economists
Moldovan MPs 2005–2009
Electoral Bloc Democratic Moldova MPs
Our Moldova Alliance politicians
Moldovan MPs 1990–1994
Popular Front of Moldova MPs